Young Hero Fang Shiyu is a 1999 Hong Kong television series based on the story of Chinese folk hero Fang Shiyu. It starred Dicky Cheung as the titular protagonist.

Plot
In the beginning, Fang Shiyu was a troublemaker in Guangzhou, constantly fighting. His mother, Miao Cuihua, helps him in clearing him of his troubles when he is confronted by his father Fang De. Fang De is harsh and gives punishments, however Fang Shiyu works with his mother on ways to get them out of trouble. After many instances, Fang De decided to have a tutor school him. One of Fang Shiyu's adversaries decided to play a trick on him. They stole Hong Xiguan's money and made it seem that Fang Shiyu stole the bag. Hong Xiguan believed that Fang Shiyu was the thief and fought him in public. After more violence, Fang De decides to send his son to Hangzhou so that Fang Shiyu could be schooled.

Cast
Dicky Cheung as Fang Shiyu
He Meitian as Ling Xiaoxiao
Louis Fan as Hong Xiguan
Miki Lee as Yan Yongchun
Tien Niu as Miao Cuihua
Zhang Zhenhuan as Fang De
Wong Yat-fei as Miao Xian
Zheng Guolin as Hu Huigan
Xie Na as Xiaoli
Cheng Pei-pei as Wumei
Shen Meng-sheng as Sande
Sin Ho-ying as Zhineng
Yu Liwen as Zhishan
Wang Weiguo as Yan Zhan
Liu Dacheng as Guan Fuzi
Lu Xingyu as Tong Qianjin
Zhuo Fan as Lei Renwang
Zhao Jian as Lei Laohu
Kiki Sheung as Li Xiaohuan
Li Haixing as Li Bashan
Huang Haibing as Chou Wanqian
Chan Hung-lit as Pak Mei
Zhu Yan as Sun Qing
Zhang Chunzhong as Feng Daode
Zhang Shaohua as Matchmaker
Elvis Tsui

See also
Fong Sai-yuk (1993 film)

References

External links
Review on spcnet

Asia Television original programming
Martial arts television series
Television series set in the Qing dynasty
Television shows set in Guangdong